Maria Romanovna Sotskova (pron. SOT-skoh-vah; ; born 12 April 2000) is a retired Russian figure skater. She is the 2017 Grand Prix Final silver medalist, a two-time Internationaux de France silver medalist (2016, 2017), the 2016 NHK Trophy bronze medalist, the 2017 CS Finlandia Trophy champion, and the 2018 Russian national silver medalist. She placed 8th at the 2017 and 2018 World Figure Skating Championships and at the 2018 Winter Olympics.

Earlier in her career, Sotskova won silver at the 2016 Winter Youth Olympics, silver at the 2016 World Junior Championships, and gold at the 2013 Junior Grand Prix Final.

Personal life 
Maria Romanovna Sotskova was born on 12 April 2000 in Reutov, Moscow Oblast, Russia. As a young child, she was engaged in both skating and rhythmic gymnastics but dropped gymnastics after her coach said that she needed to choose.

Sotskova plans to work in choreography and will begin an undergraduate degree at the Russian University of Theatre Arts - GITIS in the Ballet Masters program, from which graduates become either choreographers or tutors in the field of theatre, variety or sports choreography.

Sotskova's father passed away in June 2019.

Skating career

Early years 
Sotskova began skating as a four-year-old after her mother decided to bring her to an ice rink. Her first coach was Svetlana Panova. She won a bronze medal behind Serafima Sakhanovich at the 2013 Russian Junior Championships.

2013–2014 season: JGP Final champion 
Sotskova made her junior international debut at the 2013 Junior Grand Prix (JGP) event in Riga, Latvia; she won the silver medal behind Evgenia Medvedeva by a margin of 3.03 points. At her next JGP assignment, in Ostrava, Czech Republic, she finished second to Alexandra Proklova by over 15 points. Sotskova's silver medals qualified her for the JGP Final in Fukuoka, Japan, where she defeated teammates Sakhanovich and Medvedeva for the gold. She then took silver behind Sakhanovich at the 2014 Russian Junior Championships and was assigned to the 2014 World Junior Championships in Sofia, Bulgaria. She withdrew due to a meniscus injury.

2014–2015 season: The second Junior season 
During the 2014 JGP series, Sotskova took silver in Tallinn, Estonia, finishing second to Japan's Miyu Nakashio by 0.97, and then won gold in Zagreb, Croatia, by a margin of 1.4 points over Karen Chen of the United States. She finished fourth in Barcelona, Spain at her second JGP Final. Making her senior national debut, she placed sixth at the Russian Championships before winning the junior silver medal. Concluding her season, she placed fifth at the 2015 World Junior Championships in Tallinn.

2015–2016 season: World Junior silver medalist 
In June 2015, Sotskova travelled to Artesia, California to have her programs choreographed, and to work with Rafael Arutyunyan on her jumps. Competing in the 2015 JGP series, she won gold in Riga, Latvia, and Linz, Austria, resulting in qualification to her third JGP Final. Her first senior gold medal came at the Tallinn Trophy, an ISU Challenger Series event in November. In December, at the JGP Final in Barcelona, Sotskova placed fourth in the short and second in the free skate, which brought her the silver medal behind teammate Polina Tsurskaya and ahead of Japan's Marin Honda.

At the Russian Championships, she finished fifth on the senior level, in December, and went on to win the junior silver medal behind Tsurskaya, in January. In February, Sotskova represented Russia at the 2016 Winter Youth Olympics in Hamar, Norway, winning the silver medal behind teammate Tsurskaya again. In March, she was awarded silver at the 2016 World Junior Championships in Debrecen, Hungary, between two Japanese Honda and Wakaba Higuchi.
She was the only Russian to finish the competition, as her two teammates Polina Tsurskaya and Alisa Fedichkina withdrew right before the short skate and the free respectively, due to unexpected ankle injuries for both. Sotskova's silver medal secured the three spots for Russia in the next Junior World Champions, yet ended the Russia's five-year streak of World Junior ladies' titles.

Following the end of the season, she switched from Svetlana Panova to Elena Buianova due to CSKA Moscow's better training conditions.

2016–2017 season: Senior debut 
Sotskova began her season at the 2016 CS Ondrej Nepela Memorial, where she placed second in the short and first in the free skate to win the gold medal ahead of teammate Yulia Lipnitskaya. Making her Grand Prix debut, she won silver at the 2016 Trophée de France and bronze at the 2016 NHK Trophy, earning qualification to the Grand Prix Final in Marseille, France. In December, she finished fifth in France and then received the bronze medal at the Russian Championships, having ranked second in the short and third in the free skate, which made her qualify for European and World Champions in her first senior season. In January 2017, she placed fourth at the 2017 European Championships in Ostrava, Czech Republic, behind the bronze medalist Carolina Kostner by 18 points due to a messy free program. Two months later, at the 2017 World Championships in Helsinki, Finland, she placed sixth in the short, eleventh in the free, and eighth overall.

2017–2018 season: Winter Olympics 
After winning silver at the 2017 Skate Canada International and 2017 Internationaux de France, Sotskova qualified to her second Grand Prix Final. In December, she won two more silver medals, at the Grand Prix Final in Nagoya, Japan, and 2018 Russian Championships in Saint Petersburg.

At the 2018 European Championships, held in January in Moscow, Sotskova finished fourth, losing to teammates Alina Zagitova and Evgenia Medvedeva and Italy's Carolina Kostner. On the next day, she was named to the Russian Olympic team (together with Medvedeva and Zagitova).
In February, Sotskova represented OAR (Olympic Athletes from Russia) in Pyeongchang, South Korea. She was not selected for the team event. Competing in individual ladies' singles, she placed twelfth in the short program, seventh in the free skate, and eighth overall. The following month, she ended up with the same final result at the 2018 World Championships in Milan, Italy, after placing fifth in the short and ninth in the free.

2018–2019 season 
Sotskova made her season debut at the 2018 Japan Open, where she placed sixth individually. Competing in her third Grand Prix season, she placed ninth at the 2018 NHK Trophy and seventh at the 2018 Internationaux de France. This was the first time Maria had not qualified for the Grand Prix Final. In early December she finished fifth at the 2018 CS Golden Spin of Zagreb after obtaining a season's best score of 179.18 points. It was the first time that season that she executed a triple flip-Euler-triple Salchow combination.

At the 2019 Russian Championships, Sotskova placed twelfth in the short program due to doubling her triple Lutz, therefore losing 3.8 points in base value. In the free skate, she made many errors on her jumps, including multiple falls and underrotations. She placed sixteenth in the free skate and sixteenth overall. She was named as the second alternate to the 2019 Winter Universiade, and after the withdrawals of teammates Elizaveta Tuktamysheva and Evgenia Medvedeva, she was added to the team along with Stanislava Konstantinova. She placed seventh there with a total score of 170.20, the lowest score of her senior career.

At the end of her season, Sotskova made the decision to part ways with coach Elena Buianova and joined Svetlana Sokolovskaya's training group. The parting was amicable.

2019–2020 season 
In the early season, Sotskova was ninth at the 2019 CS Ondrej Nepela Memorial and eighth at the Denis Ten Memorial Challenge.  At her lone Grand Prix assignment, the 2019 Internationaux de France, she was eleventh of eleven skaters. She later withdrew from the Russian Nationals.

In July 2020, she announced her retirement from competitive skating.

Over two months after her retirement, she received a 10-year disqualification from the sport by the Russian Anti-Doping Agency for forging a medical certificate to explain a doping violation; it was later reported that Sotskova was using the banned diuretic furosemide. The Figure Skating Federation of Russia issued a verdict in March 2021 based on the RUSADA decision to disqualify Sotskova until April 5, 2030, backdating the start of her ban to April 2020.

Programs

Competitive highlights 
GP: Grand Prix; CS: Challenger Series; JGP: Junior Grand Prix

Detailed results

Senior level

Small medals for short and free programs awarded only at ISU Championships.

Junior level

Small medals for short and free programs awarded only at ISU Championships.

References

External links 

 
 

2000 births
Russian female single skaters
World Junior Figure Skating Championships medalists
People from Reutov
Living people
Figure skaters at the 2016 Winter Youth Olympics
Figure skaters at the 2018 Winter Olympics
Olympic figure skaters of Russia
Doping cases in figure skating
Russian sportspeople in doping cases
Competitors at the 2019 Winter Universiade
Sportspeople from Moscow Oblast